Mohammad Amir Khan (born 27 January 1986 in Kanpur, Uttar Pradesh) is an Indian first-class cricketer who plays for Uttar Pradesh cricket team. He made his first-class debut at age 18 in 2004 when played against Punjab cricket team.

References

External links
 

1986 births
Living people
Indian cricketers
Uttar Pradesh cricketers
Sportspeople from Kanpur
Wicket-keepers